Bergens Aftenblad was a Norwegian daily newspaper, published in Bergen, Norway from 1880 to 1942. It supported the Conservative Party.

History and profile
The paper was started in 1880, and absorbed the long-running Bergens Adressecontoirs Efterretninger in 1889.

The Nazis took over the paper in January 1942 and closed it on 21 April 1942. It did not return when the German occupation of Norway ended in 1945. Instead, the publishing rights were bought by Morgenavisen, another Conservative Party paper. The long-time editor of the paper, Erling Lauhn, took over as editor of Morgenavisen.

References

1880 establishments in Norway
1942 disestablishments in Norway
Conservative Party (Norway) newspapers
Defunct newspapers published in Norway
Newspapers established in 1880
Newspapers published in Bergen
Norwegian-language newspapers
Publications disestablished in 1942